Andrius Gedgaudas (born 18 September 1978) is a Lithuanian former professional football midfielder. 

In 2004 received best player award of the Lithuanian top division A Lyga while playing for FBK Kaunas.

External links
 

1978 births
Sportspeople from Kaunas
Living people
Lithuanian footballers
Association football midfielders
Lithuania international footballers
FK Žalgiris players
FK Atlantas players
FK Kareda Kaunas players
Widzew Łódź players
FC Metalurh Donetsk players
Spartak Yerevan FC players
FBK Kaunas footballers
FC Tom Tomsk players
Shamakhi FK players
FK Banga Gargždai players
TSV Rain am Lech players
FK Tauras Tauragė players
FK Klaipėdos Granitas players
A Lyga players
Ekstraklasa players
Ukrainian Premier League players
Armenian Premier League players
Russian Premier League players
Azerbaijan Premier League players
Bayernliga players
Lithuanian expatriate footballers
Expatriate footballers in Poland
Lithuanian expatriate sportspeople in Poland
Expatriate footballers in Ukraine
Lithuanian expatriate sportspeople in Ukraine
Expatriate footballers in Armenia
Lithuanian expatriate sportspeople in Armenia
Expatriate footballers in Russia
Lithuanian expatriate sportspeople in Russia
Expatriate footballers in Azerbaijan
Lithuanian expatriate sportspeople in Azerbaijan
Expatriate footballers in Germany
Lithuanian expatriate sportspeople in Germany